Henicorhynchus lineatus is a freshwater river-dwelling carp of Laos and Thailand.

Habitat 
Henicorhynchus lineatus lives primarily in the Mekong and Chao Phraya basins.

References

Henicorhynchus
Fish of Thailand
Cyprinid fish of Asia
Fish described in 1945